Khok Charoen is a district (amphoe) of Lopburi province, central Thailand.

History
The minor district (king amphoe) was created on 9 March 1987 by splitting off four tambons from Khok Samrong district. It was upgraded to full district status on 4 November 1993.

Geography
Neighboring districts are (from the north clockwise) Phaisali of Nakhon Sawan province, Wichian Buri and Si Thep of Phetchabun province, Chai Badan, Sa Bot, and Nong Muang of Lopburi Province.

Administration
The district is divided into five sub-districts (tambons), which are further subdivided into 53 villages (mubans). There are no municipal (thesaban) areas, and a further five tambon administrative organizations (TAO).

References

External links
http://www.khokjaroen.com (Thai only)
amphoe.com

Khok Charoen